This is a list of the literary works by British writer and historian Jan Morris (1926–2020).

Non-fiction

Travel
Coast to Coast (published in the US as As I Saw the USA; 1956: winner of the 1957 Cafe Royal Prize)
Sultan in Oman (1957; new edition by Eland in 2008)
The Market of Seleukia (1957)
South African Winter (1958)
The Hashemite Kings (1959)
Venice (1960: winner of the 1961 Heinemann Award)
The Presence of Spain (1964)
Spain (1964)
Oxford (1965)
The Great Port: A Passage through New York (1969)
The Venetian Empire (1980)
A Venetian Bestiary (1982)
The Matter of Wales (1984)
Spain (1988)
Hong Kong (1988)
Sydney (1992)
Trieste and the Meaning of Nowhere (2001)
A Writer's World: Travels 1950–2000 (2003)
Contact! A Book of Encounters (2010)

Essays
The Road to Huddersfield: A Journey to Five Continents (1963)
The Outriders: A Liberal View of Britain (1963)
Cities (1963)
Places (1972)
Travels (1976)
Destinations (1980)
Wales; The First Place (1982, reprinted 1998)
Journeys (1984)
Among the Cities (1985)
Locations (1992)
O Canada! (1992)
Contact! A Book of Glimpses (2009)

History

The Pax Britannica Trilogy
Heaven’s Command: An Imperial Progress (1973).  Book 1.  Covering the period 1837 to 1897
Pax Britannica: The Climax of Empire (1968). Book 2.
Farewell the Trumpets: An Imperial Retreat (1978).  Book 3.  Covering the period 1897 to 1965
 The Spectacle of Empire: Style, Effect and the Pax Britannica (1982)
 Stones of Empire: Buildings of the Raj (1983) (by Jan Morris with photographs by Simon Winchester)
 Battleship Yamato: Of War, Beauty and Irony (2018)

Biography
Fisher's Face (1995)

Memoirs
Conundrum, UK Faber and Faber, US: Harcourt Brace (1974) (personal narrative of Jan Morris' gender transition)
Wales, The First Place (1982)
Pleasures of a Tangled Life (1989)
"Herstory" (1999)
 Trieste and the Meaning of Nowhere (2001)
A Writer's House in Wales (2002)
In My Mind's Eye: A Thought Diary (2018)
Thinking Again (2020)

Other
Coronation Everest (1958)
 Ciao, Carpaccio! (2014)

Fiction

Novels
Last Letters from Hav (1985; shortlisted for the 1985 Booker Prize for Fiction)
Hav of the Myrmidons. Published together with Last Letters from Hav, as Hav (2006; shortlisted for the 2007 Arthur C Clarke Award)

Short stories
The Upstairs Donkey, and Other Stolen Stories (1961)

Miscellaneous
The World Bank. A Prospect (1963)
Manhattan '45 (hardcover 1987, paperback 1998)
Over Europe (Weldon Owen, 1991) – Jan Morris provided the text for this post-Cold War photographic project
Fifty Years of Europe: An Album (1997) – published in 2006 as Europe – An Intimate Journey
The Oxford Book of Oxford (editor)
The Matter of Wales: Epic Views of a Small Country
Lincoln: A Foreigner's Quest (2001)
Our First Leader
Thrilling Cities written by Ian Fleming. Jan Morris provided the introduction for the 2009 edition published by Ian Fleming Publications.

Bibliographies of British writers